Henry of Portugal may refer to:

 Henry, King of Portugal (1512–1580) 
 Henry, Count of Portugal (1066–1112)
 Prince Henry the Navigator or Infante Henry, Duke of Viseu (1394–1460)